Numen (plural numina) is a Latin term for "divinity", "divine presence", or "divine will." The Latin authors defined it as follows: Cicero writes of a "divine mind" (divina mens), a god "whose numen everything obeys," and a "divine power" (vis divina) "which pervades the lives of men." It causes the motions and cries of birds during augury. In Virgil's recounting of the blinding of the one-eyed giant, Polyphemus, from the Odyssey, in his Aeneid, he has Odysseus and his men first "ask for the assistance of the great numina" (magna precati numina). Reviewing public opinion of Augustus on the day of his funeral, the historian Tacitus reports that some thought "no honor was left to the gods" when he "established the cult of himself" (se ... coli vellet) "with temples and the effigies of numina" (effigie numinum). Pliny the younger in a letter to Paternus raves about the "power," the "dignity," and "the majesty;" in short, the "numen of history." Lucretius uses the expression numen mentis, or "bidding of the mind," where "bidding" is numen, not, however, the divine numen, unless the mind is to be considered divine, but as simply human will.

Since the early 20th century, numen has sometimes been treated in the history of religion as a pre-animistic phase; that is, a belief system inherited from an earlier time. Numen is also used by sociologists to refer to the idea of magical power residing in an object, particularly when writing about ideas in the western tradition. When used in this sense, numen is nearly synonymous with mana. However, some authors reserve use of mana for ideas about magic from Polynesia and southeast Asia.

Etymology
Etymologically, the word means "a nod of the head", here referring to a deity as it were "nodding", or making its will or its presence known. According to H. J. Rose: 
The literal meaning is simply "a nod", or more accurately, for it is a passive formation, "that which is produced by nodding", just as flamen is "that which is produced by blowing", i.e., a gust of wind. It came to mean "the product or expression of power" — not, be it noted, power itself.

Thus, numen (divinity) is not personified (although it can be a personal attribute) and should be distinguished from deus (god).

Roman cults of the numina
Numen was also used in the imperial cult of ancient Rome, to refer to the guardian-spirit, 'godhead' or divine power of a living emperor—in other words, a means of worshiping a living emperor without literally calling him a god.

The cult of Augustus was promoted by Tiberius, who dedicated the Ara Numinis Augusti.
In this context, a distinction can be made between the terms numen and genius.

Definition as a pre-animistic phase of religion
The expression Numen inest appears in Ovid's Fasti (III, 296) and has been translated as 'There is a spirit here'. Its interpretation, and in particular the exact sense of numen has been discussed extensively in the literature.

The supposition that a numinous presence in the natural world supposed in the earliest layers of Italic religion, as it were an "animistic" element left over in historical Roman religion and especially in the etymology of Latin theonyms, has often been popularly implied, but was criticised as "mostly a scholarly fiction" by McGeough (2004).

Numina and specific religions
The phrase "numen eris caeloque redux mirabere regna" appears on line 129 of the poem Metrum in Genesin, attributed to Hilary of Arles.

Analogies in other societies

 Brahman in Hinduism
 Kami in Japanese Shinto
 mana in Polynesian mythology
 maban in Australian Aboriginal mythology
 manetuwak in Lenape mythology
 shekhinah in Judaism
 sila, inua in Inuit mythology
 teotl in Aztec mythology
 mægen in Anglo-Saxon mythology
 väki in Baltic–Finnic mythology

See also
 Animism
 Lares
 Numinous
 Penates
 Sacred (comparative religion)

References

Further reading

External links
 Roman religion

Ancient Roman religion
Sociology of religion
Vitalism